Amolita fratercula is a species of moth in the family Erebidae first described by William Barnes and James Halliday McDunnough in 1912. It is found in North America.

The MONA or Hodges number for Amolita fratercula is 9822.

References

Further reading

 
 
 

Omopterini
Articles created by Qbugbot
Moths described in 1912